Katalin Varga is a 2009 film directed by Peter Strickland.

The feature debut of Peter Strickland, he used the money from a bequest from his uncle to fund the project. Filmed over 17 days in the Hungarian-speaking part of the Romanian region of Transylvania, Strickland completed the project for £28,000.

Plot

Katalin Varga's husband discovers that their son Orbán is not his. Together with her child, she sets out to find Antal, the man who raped her 11 years earlier, Orbán's biological father. She meets Gergely, a friend and accomplice of Antal, who does not recognize her. She seduces and then kills him. Orbán befriends Antal, both unaware of their blood ties. Antal is now a happily married man, and Katalin strikes up an intimate friendship with his wife. On a boating trip she confronts them both about the events which occurred 11 years earlier.

Accolades
The film was in the competition for the Golden Bear at the 59th Berlin International Film Festival in 2009, where it was awarded the Silver Bear for outstanding artistic contribution (sound design): György Kovács, Gábor ifj. Erdélyi and Tamás Székely. It won the European Film Award for European Discovery of the Year in 2009.

References

External links

2009 films
Films set in Transylvania
Romanian-language films
Hungarian-language films
Films directed by Peter Strickland
European Film Awards winners (films)
Silver Bear for outstanding artistic contribution
2009 directorial debut films